Cecilia Angmadlok Angutialuk (born 1938) is a Canadian Inuk artist known for her stone sculpture. Angutialuk was born in Repulse Bay, Northwest Territories, (now Naujaat, Nunavut), where she continues to live.

Her work is included in the collections of the Musée national des beaux-arts du Québec, the National Gallery of Canada, the Winnipeg Art Gallery, and Feheley Fine Arts.

References

1938 births
20th-century Canadian sculptors
20th-century Canadian women artists
21st-century Canadian sculptors
21st-century Canadian women artists
Inuit artists
Canadian women sculptors
Living people
People from Naujaat
Artists from Nunavut
Inuit from Nunavut